Suffering Hour is the first album by the St Louis thrash/progressive metal band Anacrusis, released in 1988 on the European label Active Records. The album's recording was self-financed by the band members with $1200.

The album was re-released on CD in 1990 by Metal Blade Records.

Track listing 
Music and lyrics by Kenn Nardi, except where indicated

 "Present Tense" (Nardi, Kevin Heidbreder, Tom Liskey) – 6:22
 "Imprisoned" – 6:11
 "R.O.T." (Nardi, Heidbreder) – 4:51
 "Butcher's Block" – 6:07
 "A World to Gain" – 4:04
 "Frigid Bitch" (Heidbreder) – 4:03
 "Fighting Evil" – 3:25
 "Twisted Cross" – 7:20
 "Annihilation Complete/Disembowled" (Heidbreder/Nardi, John Emery) – 4:41

Personnel
Kenn Nardi – guitars and lead vocals 
Kevin Heidbreder – guitars 
John Emery – bass guitar
Mike Owen – drums, backing vocals

References

Anacrusis (band) albums
1988 albums
Albums free for download by copyright owner
Metal Blade Records albums